Dame Ruth Runciman DBE (née Hellman; born 9 January 1936) is a former Chair of the British Mental Health Act Commission.

Early life
Hellman, as she then was, was educated at Roedean School, Johannesburg, and the Witwatersrand University, also in Johannesburg, where she gained a baccalaureate degree. She then matriculated at Girton College, Cambridge, in England

Career
Runciman became active in public life after marriages and children. In 1981, she was one of the founders of the Prison Reform Trust and was responsible for setting up a full-time Citizens' Advice Bureau in Wormwood Scrubs, the first full-time independent advice agency in any prison. She also became a Trustee of the Pilgrim Trust and the National AIDS Trust (now known as NAT), and chaired it from 2000 to 2006.  

For more than three decades, Runciman worked with the Citizens Advice Bureau and made significant contributions to work on drug misuse.

She was Chair of Central and North West London NHS Foundation Trust for more than ten years, retiring at the end of 2013.

Personal life
Between 1959 and 1962 she was married to Denis Mack Smith, a Cambridge historian of the Italian "Risorgimento".

In 1963, she married secondly the British sociologist Walter Garrison Runciman, becoming Viscountess Runciman of Doxford, a title she does not use. Runciman died on 10 December 2020. Their son David, who then inherited the peerage, is a professor of politics at the University of Cambridge.

Honours
Officer of the Order of the British Empire, 1991. 
Dame Commander of the Order of the British Empire, 1998, for services to mental health.
 Honorary Fellow of the University of Central Lancashire, 2000.

References

External links
Profile BBC.co.uk; accessed 12 July 2014. 
Parliament publications #1; accessed 12 July 2014.
Parliament publications #2; accessed 12 July 2014.
Central and North West London Mental Health Trust, cnwl.org; accessed 12 July 2014.

1936 births
Living people
People in health professions from London
Fellows of Girton College, Cambridge
British social welfare officials
British women academics
Women educators
20th-century British women
21st-century women
British viscountesses
Dames Commander of the Order of the British Empire
People involved with mental health
Place of birth missing (living people)
Ruth Runciman, Viscountess Runciman of Doxford